Stanley is a civil parish in York County, New Brunswick, Canada.

For governance purposes it is divided between the village of Stanley, the incorporated rural community of Upper Miramichi, and the local service district of the parish of Stanley. Upper Miramichi is a member of the Greater Miramichi Regional Service Commission (GMRSC), the others of Regional Service Commission 11 (RSC11).

Origin of name
The parish takes its name from the settlement of Stanley, in turn named for Lord Stanley,  Secretary of State for War and the Colonies at the time and an early supporter of the New Brunswick and Nova Scotia Land Company that promoted settlement of the area.

History
The first iteration of Stanley was erected in 1837 from Douglas and Saint Marys Parishes.

In 1838 Stanley was dissolved.

In 1847 the modern Stanley was erected from Douglas and Saint Marys, expanding to include the northern part of the county.

Boundaries
Stanley Parish is bounded:

 on the northeast by the Northumberland County line;
 on the southeast and south by a line beginning at the meeting of point of Sunbury, Northumberland, and York Counties, then running southwesterly about 5.25 kilometres along the Sunbury County line to the prolongation of the northern line of Loyalist grants along the Nashwaak River, then west-southwesterly along the prolongation and the Loyalist grants to a point about 650 metres north-northwesterly of Red Rock Branch Road and 900 metres west-southwesterly of Route 107, then southerly along the rear line the Loyalist grants on the western side of the Nashwaak, including a grant to Alexander Drummond along the English Settlement Road, to the northern line of a grant to Samuel and John Casey, then westerly about 1.6 kilometres and southerly about 1.4 kilometres to the South Branch Dunbar Stream, then westerly up the South Branch Dunbar to the eastern line of a grant to Thomas Richards fronting on the eastern side of Route 620;
 on the southwest and west by a line running along the rear line of grants fronting on the east side of Route 620 and Currieburg Road to the northeastern corner of a grant to Isaac Woodward Jouett, on the south side of Mick Road, then running north to the Carleton County line;
 on the northwest by the Carleton and Victoria County lines.

Communities
Communities at least partly within the parish. bold indicates an incorporated municipality or incorporated rural community; italics indicate a name no longer in official use

 Centreville
 Cross Creek
 Cross Creek Station
 English Settlement
 Giants Glen (The Glen)
 Green Hill
 Limekiln
 Maple Grove
 Maple Grove Station
 Mavis Mills
 Red Rock
 South Portage
 Stanley
 Sutherland Siding
 Tay Falls
 Tay Valley
 Ward Settlement
 Williamsburg
 Woodlands
  rural community of Upper Miramichi
  Astle
 Bloomfield Ridge
 Clearwater
 Gordon Vale
 Hayesville
  McGivney
 North Cains
  Parker Ridge
  Taxis River
 Tugtown

Bodies of water
Bodies of water at least partly within the parish.

 Cains River
 Dungarvon River
 Little Dungarvon River
 Nashwaak River
 Southwest Miramichi River
 Taxis River
 Tay River
 Tuadook River
 Hinman Branch
 Dunbar Stream
 Cathle Creek
 Cross Creek
 more than thirty officially named lakes

Islands
Islands at least partly within the parish.

 Clearwater Island
 Gaspereau Island
 Grassy Island
 Lower Birch Island
 Palmer Island
 Slate Island
 Strongbow Island
 Upper Birch Island
 Hayes Bar

Other notable places
Parks, historic sites, and other noteworthy places at least partly within the parish.
 Bantalor Wildlife Management Area
 Clearwater Aerodrome
 Plaster Rock-Renous Wildlife Management Area
 Push and Be Damned Rapids
 Taxis Airstrip
 Tay River Protected Natural Area

Demographics
Parish population total does not include  village of Stanley and portion within  Upper Miramichi

Population
Population trend

Language
Mother tongue (2016)

See also
List of parishes in New Brunswick

Notes

References

External links
 The Village of Stanley
 Upper Miramichi Rural Community

Parishes of York County, New Brunswick